Operation Dekel, was the largest offensive by Israeli forces in the north of Palestine after the first truce of the 1948 Arab-Israeli War. It was carried out by the 7th Armoured Brigade led by Canadian volunteer Ben Dunkelman (called Benjamin Ben-David in Israel), a battalion from the Carmeli Brigade, and some elements from the Golani Brigade between 8–18 July. Its objective was to capture Nazareth and the Lower Galilee.

On 15 July Israeli aircraft bombed Saffuriya village and caused panic among the population; many of the villagers fled northwards toward Lebanon, others found shelter in Nazareth, leaving about 100 elderly people behind.

On the evening of 16 July, Nazareth surrendered to the Israelis after a light fight which left one Israeli dead and one wounded. The Arab Liberation Army forces in the village under the command of Fawzi al-Qawuqji retreated to the mountains in the north. In sharp contrast to the surrounding towns, the inhabitants of Nazareth were never forced to evacuate as Dunkelman refused to obey orders from Haim Laskov to evacuate them.

Palestinian Arab villages captured in Operation Dekel

See also
 Depopulated Palestinian locations in Israel
 List of battles and operations in the 1948 Palestine war
 Killings and massacres during the 1948 Palestine war

References

External links
Operation Dekel Jewish Virtual Library

Dekel
July 1948 events in Asia